Redykołka is a type of cheese produced in the Podhale region of Poland. It is sometimes known as the "younger sister" of the Oscypek cheese and the two are occasionally confused. The cheese is often made in the shape of animals, hearts, or decorative wreaths.

References

Polish cheeses
Polish products with protected designation of origin